West Michigan Firewomen is an American women’s soccer team, founded in 2004. The team is a member of the United Soccer Leagues W-League, the second tier of women’s soccer in the United States and Canada. The team plays in the Midwest Division of the Central Conference against teams from Chicago, Fort Wayne, Indianapolis, Kalamazoo Outrage, Medina and Minneapolis.

The club's colors are red and white.

The team is a sister organization of the men's Chicago Fire Premier team, which plays in the USL Premier Development League, and an affiliate of the Chicago Fire Major League Soccer franchise.

Players

Current roster

Year-by-year

External links
West Michigan Firewomen

Women's soccer clubs in the United States
Soccer clubs in Michigan
USL W-League (1995–2015) teams
2004 establishments in Michigan
Association football clubs established in 2004
Ottawa County, Michigan
Sports in Grand Rapids, Michigan
Women's sports in Michigan